The Open Tarragona Costa Daurada was a tennis tournament held in Tarragona, Spain since 2006. The event was part of the ATP Challenger Tour and was played on outdoor clay courts.
Spanish player Alberto Martín detains the record for victories, two, in singles.

Past finals

Singles

Doubles

External links 
Official website
ITF search

 
ATP Challenger Tour
Defunct tennis tournaments in Spain
Tarra